Tulu Nadu State movement (തുളുനാട് രാജ്യ സമിതി) is aimed at increasing Tulu Nadu's influence and political power through the formation of separate Tulu Nadu state from Karnataka and Kerala. Tulu Nadu is a region on the south-western coast of India. It consists of  Dakshina Kannada and Udupi districts of  Karnataka, and Kasargod district up to the Chandragiri river in Kerala. The Chandragiri river is traditionally considered to be a boundary between Tulu Nadu and Kerala from the fourteenth century AD onwards. The first call for separate Tulu Nadu state was made just after the Quit India Movement in 1942 by Srinivas Updhyaya Paniyadi, a banker and a press owner from Udupi. Mangalore is the largest and the chief city of Tulu Nadu. Tulu activists have been demanding a separate Tulu Nadu state since the late 2000s, considering language and culture as the basis for their demand.

Tulu Nadu was ruled by several major powers, including the Kadambas, Alupas, Vijayanagara dynasty, and the Keladi Nayakas. The region was unified with the state of Mysore (now called Karnataka) in 1956. The region encompassing Tulu Nadu formerly comprised the district of South Canara. Tulu Nadu is demographically and linguistically diverse with several languages commonly spoken and understood, including Tulu, Kundagannada, Konkani and Beary.

Distinct identity
 
According to the 1961 Census of India statistics, Tulu speakers (67.27 per cent) constituted the majority of the population of Dakshina Kannada, followed by Konkani (20.62 per cent). The predominant languages in Tulu Nadu are Tulu, Kundagannada, Konkani, Malayalam, and Beary, with Tulu being the lingua franca in Mangalore and major parts of Udupi district. 

Hinduism is followed by a large number of the population, with Billavas, Devadigas, Bunts, Kulalas, Mogaveeras, Ganiga and Vokkaliga (Native Tuluvas). Kota Brahmins (Kannada), Koteshwara Brahmins (Kannada), Shivalli Brahmins, Sthanika Brahmins (Tulu), Vishwa Brahmins (Kannada, Tulu) Havyaka Brahmins (Havyakannada), Karhade Brahmins (Marathi) Goud Saraswat Brahmins (Konkani), Daivadnya Brahmins (Konkani), and Rajapur Saraswat Brahmins (Konkani) also form significant sections of the Hindu population. 

Christians form a sizeable section of Mangalorean society, with Konkani-speaking Catholics, popularly known as Mangalorean Catholics, accounting for the largest Christian community in Tulu Nadu. Protestants in Tulu Nadu, known as Mangalorean Protestants, typically speak Kannada. Most Muslims in Tulu Nadu are Bearys, who speak Beary Bashe. There is also a sizeable community of landowners following Jainism, known as the Tulu Jains.

Reasons

As a result of the States Reorganisation Act (1956), South Canara (part of the Madras Presidency under the British) was incorporated into the dominion of the newly created Mysore State (now called Karnataka). Although Tulu Nadu has a distinct cultural and linguistic identity, a separate state was not created formed the independence. Tuluva activists had raised some serious issues on the development of Mangalore and Tulu Nadu. One of them was that the Karnataka State Government has been focusing only on the development of Bangalore, the capital of Karnataka, and its periphery, and cities such as Mangalore and Udupi in Tulu Nadu were grossly neglected. They also alleged that the Government had "totally neglected" Dakshina Kannada and Udupi districts. They alleged that Kerala Government too showed similar attitude towards the northern parts of Kasargod district.

The Tulu Rajya Horata Samiti, which is active in the Dakshina Kannada, Udupi, and Kasaragod districts advocate self-rule as the only solution for the much awaited developmental works of the region. The Samithi rejected the initiative of the Karnataka State Government to change the name of Mangalore as Mangaluru. It insisted that if it is changed it should be changed as Kudla. Other demands are renaming Mangalore International Airport as "Koti Chennaya International Airport". Samiti aims to create awareness among the Tulu speaking people with regard to the "inevitability of a separate state and enthusing them to fight for the cause."

In the early 21st century, the Tulu Nadu movement gained momentum in the region with support from notable Mangalorean Kannada poet Kayyara Kinyanna Rai and former Member of Parliament Ramanna Rai. In an interview, Kinyanna Rai said "political boundaries might not mean anything to people who were fighting for the survival of a language and its culture. Karnataka and Kerala governments spoke about "Tier-II cities" and the "Smart City" concept, but investment was not forthcoming". In another interview, Ramanna Rai said that "the work on the Mangalore–Bangalore railway line was completed after 35 years of its launch." He also said that "he would not accept the laying of a meter gauge line between the two cities and converting it into broad gauge as a development project particularly when there was no rail link for nine years."

In 2008, the former president of the Kannada Sahitya Parishat, Harikrishna Punaroor stated:

Mahajan Panel Report
The issue of bifurcation and merger of the northern part of Kasaragod district (to the north of the Chandragiri river) with Karnataka, as recommended by the Justice Mahajan Commission as early as in 1968, was discussed in Lok Sabha elections in 2004.
 
United Democratic Front (UDF) candidate N. A. Muhammed in an interview to The Hindu said he would not do anything that would distort or topple a bill favouring the implementation of the Mahajan Commission report. He also said that he would not press for implementation of the Mahajan Commission report but would certainly not act against it if such a bill was moved in the Parliament.

See also
Belgaum border dispute
Kaveri River water dispute
Gokak agitation
Tulu To 8th schedule
Black Day For Tulunad

Citations

References

Further reading 
  
 
 
 
 
 
 
 

Tulu Nadu
Regionalism in India